The 6th Tactical Fighter Squadron is a squadron of the 8th Air Wing of the Japan Air Self-Defense Force based at Tsuiki Air Base, in Fukuoka Prefecture, Japan. It is equipped with Mitsubishi F-2 and Kawasaki T-4 aircraft.

History
In September 2017 it conducted training with US Air Force Rockwell B-1B Lancer bombers.

Tail markings
Since the F-1 period the squadron's tail markings have been a sword with a bow and arrow.

Aircraft operated

Fighter aircraft
 North American F-86F Sabre (1959-1981)
 Mitsubishi F-1 (1981-2006)
 Mitsubishi F-2 (2004-present)

Liaison aircraft
 Lockheed T-33A (1959-1992)
 Mitsubishi T-2 (1981-2006)
 Kawasaki T-4 (1991-present)

See also
 Fighter units of the Japan Air Self-Defense Force

References

Units of the Japan Air Self-Defense Force